Mohammad-Ali Taskhiri (19 October 1944 – 18 August 2020) was an Iranian cleric and diplomat. During the 1980s, Taskhiri served as the Iranian representative to the Organisation of the Islamic Conference and was involved in promoting Iranian interests during the height of the Iran–Iraq War.

His role, while always significant in the government of Iran, became even more so after the invasion of Iraq in 2003. Taskhiri was born in Iraq and was an important liaison with Shia Iraqi organizations. He was a signatory to an letter from 38 Muslim scholars, sent as the official Islamic response to comments made by Pope Benedict XVI on September 12, 2006. He was one of the Ulama signatories of the Amman Message, which gives a broad foundation for defining Muslim orthodoxy.

After the late Ayatollah Vaezzadeh Khorasani, Ayatollah Taskhiri was the Secretary General of the World Assembly for the Proximity of Islamic Schools of Thought for many years, and due to his scientific ability and familiarity with Arabic and English languages, he took effective measures to unite the Islamic world.

He was also for a while the vice-president of the International Union of Muslim Scholars, who resigned after Qaradawi's bizarre stances.
Ayatollah Taskhiri chaired the Supreme Council of the Assembly for the Proximity of Islamic Schools of Thought and represented the Leadership Assembly of Experts.

Biography of the herald of the Islamic Unity

Ayatollah Mohammad Ali Taskhiri, the son of the late Hojjat al-Islam wal-muslemin Hajj Sheikh Ali Akbar, was born in 1944 in Najaf Ashraf and his father was from Tonekabon, one of the western cities of Mazandaran province in Iran.
He completed his primary and secondary education in Najaf and taught seminary courses up to the stage of Kharidj fiqh in the presence of great masters such as the great Ayatullah Martyr Seyyed Mohammad Baqir Sadr, Khoi, Seyyed Mohammad Taghi Hakim, Sheikh Javad Tabrizi, Sheikh Kazem Tabrizi, Sadr Badkoubi and Sheikh Mojtaba Lankarani also studied at the Faculty of Jurisprudence in Najaf, majoring in Arabic literature, jurisprudence and principles.
Ayatollah Taskhiri also taught common subjects while studying in the seminary of Najaf Ashraf; In the field of Arabic poetry and literature, he also benefited from the presence of great masters such as Ayatollah Sheikh Mohammad Reza Muzaffar, Sheikh Abdul Mahdi Matar and Sheikh Mohammad Amin Zainuddin.
At the beginning of his youth, with great enthusiasm for Arabic poetry and literature, he composed Arabic poems and literary lectures on various occasions and in various circles of poetry and literature; He took an active part in the political struggle against the Ba'athist regime in Iraq, and in this connection he was imprisoned and sentenced to death, but he was saved with the help of God Almighty.

In 1971, he went to the seminary of Qom and participated in the courses of great professors such as Ayatollah Golpayegani, Ayatollah Vahid Khorasani and Ayatollah Mirza Hashem Amoli for nearly 10 years; During this period, he also taught seminary sciences and Arabic literature in some scientific and academic centers across the country, and with the victory of the glorious Islamic Revolution of Iran, he spent all his time on cultural affairs and Islamic propaganda inside and outside the country.

Activities and positions

Ayatollah Taskhiri has held the following positions in cultural, Islamic propaganda and executive positions:
 Member of the Assembly of Leadership Experts of Gilan Province since 1998
Advisor to the Supreme Leader on Cultural Affairs of the Islamic World
 International Deputy of the Office of the Supreme Leader since 1990
 High Adviser on International Affairs Ba'thah of the Supreme Leader in Hajj Affairs and its Deputy International
 Head of the Islamic Culture and Relations Organization from the establishment in 1994 to 2000 
Adviser to the Minister of Culture and Islamic Guidance on International Affairs
 International Deputy of the Islamic Propaganda Organization from 1981 to 1991
 Member of the Board of Trustees of the Islamic Propaganda Organization
 Responsible for the committee for supervising the educational programs of foreign students inside and outside the country
 Secretary General of the World Assembly of Ahl al-Bayt for nine years and a member of its Supreme Council
 Member of the Supreme Council of the World Assembly for the Proximity of Islamic Schools of Thought
 Secretary General of the World Assembly for the Proximity of Islamic Schools of Thought 
 Member of the jurisprudential committee of the Ahl al-Bayt Assembly located in the seminary of Qom
 Chairman of the Cultural Committee of the 8th Conference of the World Muslim Leaders in Tehran
 Chairman of the Coordinating Committee for Joint Islamic Activities in the Organization of the Islamic Conference
 Member of the Board of Trustees of the Organization of Religious Schools Abroad
 Member of the Board of Trustees of the Organization for the Defense of the Children's Rights (Kafel)
 Member of the High Committee for Cultural Affairs of Amirkabir Institute from 1981 to 1996
 Member of the Board of Trustees of Tehran School of Principles of Religion
 Chairman of the Board of Trustees of the University of the Islamic Schools of Thought.
 Member of Jeddah Islamic Jurisprudence Association since its establishment in 1983 and representative of Iranian seminaries.
 Professor of Imam Sadegh University in the field of contemporary jurisprudence
 Professor at Tarbiat Modarres University in the field of Islamic economics
 Supervisor of Al-Tawhid Magazines, Risale-i-Thaqalin and Risale-ul-Taqrib in Arabic, which are currently being published
 Member of the jurisprudential committee of the World Bank of Islamic Development.
 Member of the Board of Trustees of the ECO Cultural Organization
 Member of Damascus Arabic Language Association
 Member of the Sharia Assembly of the Audit Committee of Financial Institutions in Bahrain
 Member of Al-Bayt Institute of Islamic Thought.
 Vice President of the International Union of Muslim Scholars

Works

 In the Companion of some Islamic Conferences of the Ministers of the Islamic Countries
 Enlightening in the Course of the Islamic unity
 Unity
 A Glance at the Life Activities of the Imams of the Ahlu-al-Bayte
 Some Intimate Writings on Leaves
 Convergence between Christianity and Islam
 The System of Servitude in Islam
 Economics
 Fasting and the Relevant Common Traditions
 About the Last Savior (His Excellency the Hojjat-ibn-al-Hassan-al- Askari)
 Islamic Government
 On the Satanic Verses
 About the Constitution of the Islamic Republic of Iran (The Structures of the Islamic System)
 Islamic Uprising
 In the Companion of People and Some Memories
 The Islamic Thought Conferences in Algeria
 The Rules of the Principles of Jurisprudence according to the Ja'afari's School of Shi'is
 Rules of Jurisprudence
 General Phenomena in Islam
 On Shi'ah and Religious Authoriy
 Together with the Meetings of the Assembly of Islamic Jurisprudence -in the city of Jaddah (S.Arabia)
 The International Conference of Population and Development
 An Exegesis of the Magnificent Qur'an (1)
 The Islamic Penal System
 The Islamic View on the Imposed Peace
 Hajj (Pilgrimage), the Aims and Functions
 The Spring and the Fish (A Story for Children)
 Zaqat (The Islamic System of Taxation)
 Islam, the Religion of True Dignity
 Friday Congressional Prayers and the Relevant Common Traditions
 Muslims! March towards Unity
 Towards God, the Almighty
 The Superstition of the Eternity of Matter
 Palestine's Melody of Resistance
 The Messenger from among the Common People
 Man and the Divine Decree
 The Transcending Objective of Human Life
 The Causes of the Inclination to Materialism (A Translation from Persian)
 Towards a Better Life
 Lectures on the Principles of Religion
 Life History of the Holy Prophet (of Islam)
 The Issues of Imamate (the Islamic Leadership) and Welayet (Authority) in the Glorious Qur'an
 Social Evolution of Human Being
 About "Globalization"
 Self-Recovery
 On Idealism and Realism
 God and Nature
 Islamic Unity based on Scientific authority of Ahlal-Bayte
 Lectures on Quran Science
 Islamic Minorities
 Unity and proximity of Islamic religious
 Opinion of dialogue with others
 Common traditions in three volumes

References

1944 births
2020 deaths
Iranian ayatollahs
Iranian people of Iraqi descent
Combatant Clergy Association politicians
Popular Front of Islamic Revolution Forces politicians
Islamic Dawa Party politicians